Cielito Lindo Airstrip is a public-use dirt airstrip located South of San Quintín, Municipality of Ensenada, Baja California, Mexico, just on the Pacific Ocean coast, near the "La Pinta" Hotel. The airstrip is used solely for general aviation  purposes. The CND code is used as identifier.

External links
Cielito Lindo Airstrip Info
Baja Bush Pilots forum about San Quintín airstrips

Airports in Baja California